

Paintings

External links

Sources

Works by Italian people
Chierici